Deshaun Thomas (born August 29, 1991) is an American professional basketball player for Olimpia Milano of the Lega Basket Serie A (LBA) and the EuroLeague. Thomas played college basketball for Ohio State University and was drafted 58th overall in the 2013 NBA draft by the San Antonio Spurs.

Early life
Even as a young man, the basketball prospects of Thomas were apparent to those who knew him. As a 5th-grade student at Northcrest Elementary School in Fort Wayne, Indiana, Thomas's height had already surpassed that of many of his teachers.  As a middle-schooler at Northwood Middle School, Thomas led the school's basketball team to back-to-back Fort Wayne middle school championships.

High school career
Thomas attended Bishop Luers High School in Fort Wayne, where he was ranked as one of the top basketball players in the nation for the class of 2010.  As a sophomore and then again as a junior, he led the Bishop Luers Knights to back-to-back Class 2A Indiana state championships.  His 34 points and 15 rebounds in 2009 each stand as the second best ever in the class 2A state championship game.

Prior to Thomas, the Knights had never won a Summit Athletic Conference Holiday Basketball Tournament, and their overall history in the tournament still stands as the worst record of all-time.  However, in 2007-2009, Thomas led the Knights to back-to-back-to-back three-peat tournament titles as a sophomore, junior and senior.

Thomas was a prolific scorer throughout his high school career.  Thomas finished his career ranked 3rd best all-time among all Indiana high school boys' basketball players and 4th best all-time when considering both boys and girls.

As a freshman, Thomas orally committed to play for coach Thad Matta at the Ohio State University.  For the season, Thomas averaged 28.95 points per game, finishing second in the state behind the 28.96 average of former Indiana Hoosier Eric Gordon.

As a senior, Thomas and his Luers teammates traveled to Columbus, Ohio to participate in the 2010 Ohio Scholastic Play-by-Play Classic, a seven-game showcase featuring high school teams of players recruited by Ohio State and other Division I universities. Luers draw in the program was the feature game of the year's classic, against the nation's #1-rated high school team, Columbus Northland High School, coincidentally from the Buckeyes' home town.  Northland featured two Buckeye recruits - Jared Sullinger, the previous year's Ohio Mr. Basketball and the #1 high school recruit in the nation; and J.D. Weatherspoon.  A fourth OSU recruit, Jordan Sibert, also played in the classic.  This four-man coupe are key reasons the Buckeyes had what some say was the #1 recruiting class for 2010. Although Northland won the game 88-67, Thomas led all scorers with 36 points. Sullinger contributed 24 points to Northland's total, and Weatherspoon added 8 points with output stunted due to foul trouble.

On February 11, 2010, Thomas played his last home basketball game for Bishop Luers.  At that Senior Night game, it was announced to the fans that Thomas had been selected to the roster of the 2010 McDonald's All-American Boys Game.  The game was played March 31, 2010 at the Jerome Schottenstein Center, home court of the Ohio State Buckeyes. Joining Thomas on the game's roster were Sullinger and Ray McCallum, Jr., a star guard from Detroit Country Day.  Bishop Luers had played the McCallum-led Country Day earlier in Thomas' senior season.

On February 18, 2010, Thomas was named as a participant in Nike's 2010 Jordan Brand Classic, played April 17, 2010 at Madison Square Garden in New York City.

On February 24, 2010, it was announced that Thomas was one of six finalists being considered for the 2010 Naismith Award, a prestigious honor given annually by the Atlanta Tipoff Club to the high school boys' basketball player of the year.  The 2010 recipient was future teammate Jared Sullinger.

On March 13, 2010, Thomas and the Bishop Luers Knights lost 70–68 in a stunning upset to the Southwood Knights in the regional tournament opening round.  Thomas ended his high school career with 3,018 points, just the third player in Indiana boys' basketball to reach the 3,000 point level.  The total fell just one point short of tying second place holder Marion Pierce.

On March 25, 2010, it was announced that Thomas was one of 26 players named to the Associated Press's Indiana All-Century team, a special team selected in honor of the 100th anniversary of the Indiana high school basketball tournament.

On March 29, 2010, it was announced that Thomas was selected as a first-team member of the 2010 Parade All-America Team.

The culmination of Thomas's career came April 3, 2010 when he was named recipient of the 2010 Indiana Mr. Basketball award.

On April 9, 2010, the Associated Press announced that Thomas had been named to their 1st-team Indiana high school All-State team.  Thomas was the leading vote-getter among all honorees.  The award marked the fourth time in his high school career that Thomas had been named a member of the team and the third straight time he was a 1st-team selection.  Days later, Thomas was named as the first three-time winner of the Tiffany Gooden award, given annually to the best basketball player in the Summit Athletic Conference.

On May 21, 2010, in a ceremony at Bishop Luers, Thomas' #1 jersey was retired by the school.  This was the first time in school history a jersey of any of its athletes had been retired.

On June 11–12, 2010, Thomas led the Indiana All-stars in a pair of games against cross-border rivals from Kentucky.  Thomas played a significant role in the Indiana sweep of the two game series.  He scored 18 points and added 13 rebounds as Indiana won the first game in Kentucky, and he scored a game-high 28 points and picked up 12 rebounds in the following night's victory in Indianapolis.

High school statistics

|-
| style="text-align:left;"| 2006–07
| style="text-align:left;"| Bishop Luers HS
| 23 ||  ||  || .500 || .260 || .730 || 13.3 || 2.5 || 1.4 || 1.4 || 29.0
|-
| style="text-align:left;"| 2007–08
| style="text-align:left;"| Bishop Luers HS
| 27 ||  ||  || .500 || .390 || .740 || 12.1 || 2.4 || 1.8 || 2.4 || 28.6
|-
| style="text-align:left;"| 2008–09
| style="text-align:left;"| Bishop Luers HS
| 27 ||  ||  || .480 || .310 || .760 || 15.1 || 2.7 || 1.6 || 2.5 || 30.3
|-
| style="text-align:left;"| 2009–10
| style="text-align:left;"| Bishop Luers HS
| 24 ||  ||  || .500 || .320 || .820 || 15.3 || 3.0 || 1.3 || 2.7 || 31.8
|-
| style="text-align:left;"| Career
| style="text-align:left;"| 
| 101 ||  ||  || .496 || .324 || .767 || 13.9 || 2.7 || 1.5 || 2.3 || 29.9

Source

College career
Thomas graduated from high school as a highly regarded five-star player who verbally committed to play for the Ohio State Buckeyes when he was still a high school freshman.  As a senior on November 11, 2009, Thomas formalized his decision by signing a letter of intent with the Buckeyes.

College highlights

2010–11 - Freshman
In his first collegiate game, Thomas came off the bench to score 24 points and grab 8 rebounds against North Carolina A&T.  Thomas also made 2-for-3 from three-point range.
November 29, 2010 - Named Big 10 Freshman of the Week
On January 22, 2011, Thomas played a key role to enable a second-half come-from-behind road victory against Illinois.  He sank three straight shots, including two 3-pointers, to allow the #1-ranked Buckeyes to remain unbeaten with their 20th win of the season.
On February 27, 2011, Thomas led all scorers with 22 points in a late-season victory over Indiana, including all 14 of his team's points in one 14-3 first half spurt.
For the season's 37 games, Thomas averaged 7.5 pts/game (5th best on the team) while playing an average of 14.0 minutes/game (7th best).  He was fourth on the team with an average of 3.5 rebounds/game.  Thomas did not start in any game, but he was consistently the first forward off the bench.  Thomas' contributions helped the Buckeyes to a 34-3 record, including 16-2 to win the Big 10 regular season championship.  In addition, his play helped the Buckeyes win the Big 10 Post-season Tournament and get named as the #1-ranking in the overall field of 68 teams playing in the NCAA post-season tournament.  With their 24-0 run to start the season, the Buckeyes were ranked 1st in the nation by most major polls for a significant part of the season.
2011–12 - Sophomore
Since the team lost three key players from the prior year, Thomas has assumed a bigger role in this year's team strategy.  Through the team's first 12 games, Thomas has started each game and averaged 28.8 minutes of playing time.
On December 19, 2011, Thomas was named Big 10 Men's Basketball Player of the Week after two solid games.  Responding to the absence of injured team leader Jared Sullinger, Thomas scored 23 points and 30 points in the two games played that week.  Each game resulted in a victory, at home against South Carolina Upstate and on the road against South Carolina.
On February 18, 2012, Thomas recorded his first career double-double, leading the Buckeyes with 25 points and 13 rebounds in a Big Ten road loss at Michigan.
On May 3, 2012, at the conclusion of the regular season in which Thomas started in all 31 of the Buckeye games, Deshaun was honored by being named to the Coaches' 2nd Team All Big-10.  He was also selected to the 3rd Team in a vote by the media.
On March 15, 2012, Thomas had one of the best games of his career.  In the 2nd round of the NCAA Tournament, Deshaun led the Buckeyes to a 78-59 victory over Loyola (MD).  In that game, Thomas was the leading scorer with a career-high 31 points, and he also led the game with 12 rebounds.
2012–13 - Junior
Early in the season, Thomas led the Buckeyes to the title in the 2012 Naismith Memorial Basketball Hall of Fame Tipoff championship.  For his efforts, Thomas was named tournament MVP.
On April 5, 2013, Thomas announced that he would be foregoing his senior season at Ohio State to enter the 2013 NBA Draft.  He left the school as the 9th best scorer in school history after a junior season that posted the 3rd highest single-season total ever by a Buckeye.

College statistics

|-
| style="text-align:left;"| 2010–11
| style="text-align:left;"| Ohio State
| 37 || 0 || 14.0 || .479 || .328 || .797 || 3.5 || 0.5 || 0.4 || 0.2 || 7.5
|-
| style="text-align:left;"| 2011–12
| style="text-align:left;"| Ohio State
| 39 || 39 || 31.4 || .520 || .345 || .748 || 5.4 || 0.9 || 0.4 || 0.2 || 15.9
|-
| style="text-align:left;"| 2012–13
| style="text-align:left;"| Ohio State
| 37 || 37 || 35.4 || .445 || .344 || .834 || 5.9 || 1.3 || 0.5 || 0.3 || 19.8
|-
| style="text-align:left;"| Career
| style="text-align:left;"| 
| 113 || 76 || 27.0 || .482 || .339 || .792 || 4.9 || 0.9 || 0.4 || 0.2 || 14.4

Source

Professional career

JSF Nanterre (2013–14)
Thomas was selected with the 58th overall pick in the 2013 NBA draft by the San Antonio Spurs. He joined the Spurs for the 2013 NBA Summer League where he averaged 12.4 points, 5.0 rebounds and 1.2 assists in five games. On August 16, 2013, he signed with JSF Nanterre of France for the 2013–14 season. In 30 league games for Nanterre, he averaged 12.2 points, 3.9 rebounds and 1.1 assists per game.

Barcelona Bàsquet (2014–15)
In July 2014, Thomas re-joined the Spurs for the 2014 NBA Summer League where he averaged 10.8 points and 3.2 rebounds in six games. On August 31, 2014, he signed a one-year deal with FC Barcelona of the Liga ACB. In 43 league games, he averaged 8.4 points and 2.8 rebounds per game.

Austin Spurs (2015–16)
On September 28, 2015, Thomas signed with the Spurs. However, he was later waived by the Spurs on October 21 after appearing in two preseason games. Nine days later, he was acquired by the Austin Spurs of the NBA Development League as an affiliate player of San Antonio.

Anadolu Efes (2016–17)
On June 29, 2016, Thomas joined the Charlotte Hornets for the 2016 NBA Summer League.

On July 14, 2016, Thomas signed a 1+1 deal with Turkish club Anadolu Efes. On June 28, 2017, Efes officially opted out of their deal with Thomas, and the player became a free agent.

Maccabi Tel Aviv (2017–18)
On July 17, 2017, Thomas signed a 1+1 deal with the Israeli team Maccabi Tel Aviv of the EuroLeague. On October 26, 2017, Thomas recorded a career-high 28 points, shooting 11-of-16 from the field, along with 5 rebounds and 2 assists in an 84–87 loss to Crvena zvezda.

In 58 games played for Maccabi (played in the EuroLeague and the Israeli League), he averaged 11.5 points, 3.5 rebounds, and 1.0 assists, while shooting 41 percent from 3-point range. Thomas won the 2017 Israeli League Cup and the 2018 Israeli League Championship with Maccabi.

Panathinaikos (2018–2020)
On July 30, 2018, Thomas signed a one-year deal with Greek club Panathinaikos of the EuroLeague, joining his former head coach Xavi Pascual.
On February 17, 2019, Thomas won the Greek Basketball Cup title by helping Panathinaikos BC win PAOK BC (79-73) in the Big Final, held in Heraklion Indoor Sports Arena, Crete. Deshaun had 12 points and 10 rebounds (double-double). Deshaun won the Greek Championship too, after Panathinaikos beaten Promitheas, undefeated in best-of-five series. He had 13.3 points, 4.7 rebounds and 1.3 assists in 23.2 minutes in the League. On July 2, 2019, Thomas extended his contract with Panathinaikos for two more years.

Alvark Tokyo (2020–2021)
On August 1, 2020, the Alvark Tokyo announced that they had reached agreement with Thomas in joining them.

Bayern Munich (2021–present)
On August 10, 2021, he has signed with Bayern Munich of the Basketball Bundesliga (BBL).

Career Statistics

|-
| align="left" | 2013–14
| align="left" | Nanterre
| LNB Pro A
| 30 || 22.0 || .435 || .376 || .787 || 3.9 || 1.1 || .2 || .0 || 12.2 
|-
| align="left" | 2014–15
| align="left" | Barcelona
| EuroLeague
| 28 || 19.4 || .526 || .395 || .639 || 2.5 || .5 || .4 || .3 || 7.1 
|-
| align="left" | 2015–16
| align="left" | Austin Spurs
| NBA D-League
| 53 || 29.1 || .516 || .294 || .790 || 6.1 || 2.3 || .6 || .3 || 15.4
|-
| align="left" | 2016–17
| align="left" | Anadolu Efes
| EuroLeague
| 35 || 14.2 || .510 || .328 || .806 || 1.7 || .3 || .2 || .1 || 7.3 
|-
| align="left" | 2017–18
| align="left" | Maccabi Tel Aviv
| EuroLeague
| 28 || 24.2 || .445 || .425 || .689 || 3.3 || 1.2 || .5 || .1 || 11.5
|-
| align="left" | 2018–19
| align="left" | Panathinaikos
| EuroLeague
| 32 || 22.4 || .487 || .355 || .689 || 3.8 || .6 || .6 || .1 || 10.5 ||
|-
| align="left" | 2019–20
| align="left" | Panathinaikos
| EuroLeague
| 28 || 29.4 || .493 || .359 || .781 || 4.4 || 1.0 || 1.0 || .2 || 13.9
|-
|-class=sortbottom
| align="center" colspan=2 | Career
| All Leagues
| 234 || 23.1 || .479 || .357 || .751 || 3.9 || 1.1 || .5 || .2 || 11.5

Awards and accomplishments

References

External links
 Deshaun Thomas at acb.com 
 Deshaun Thomas at draftexpress.com
 Deshaun Thomas at eurobasket.com
 Deshaun Thomas at euroleague.net
 

1991 births
Living people
21st-century African-American sportspeople
African-American basketball players
All-American college men's basketball players
Alvark Tokyo players
American expatriate basketball people in France
American expatriate basketball people in Germany
American expatriate basketball people in Greece
American expatriate basketball people in Israel
American expatriate basketball people in Japan
American expatriate basketball people in Spain
American expatriate basketball people in Turkey
American men's basketball players
Anadolu Efes S.K. players
Austin Spurs players
Basketball players from Fort Wayne, Indiana
FC Barcelona Bàsquet players
FC Bayern Munich basketball players
Nanterre 92 players
Liga ACB players
Maccabi Tel Aviv B.C. players
McDonald's High School All-Americans
Ohio State Buckeyes men's basketball players
Panathinaikos B.C. players
Parade High School All-Americans (boys' basketball)
Power forwards (basketball)
San Antonio Spurs draft picks
Small forwards